Sur Caribe is a band from Santiago de Cuba. Its director Ricardo Leyva who writes most of the songs, joined in 1987.

Discography
 Con To´ (2002)
 Caminando (2004)
 Credenciales (2005)
 Horizonte Próximo (mp3 2009; CD & DVD set 2010)

External links

Official Site
Exclusive interview with Ricardo Leyva.
Sur Caribe on Cubamusic.com
Sur Caribe on Spotify

Cuban musical groups